Lancia 140 is an Italian trolleybus produced from 1967 to 1968. The vehicles are double decker. Until 1995 trolleybuses of this model were used in Porto, Portugal. This trolleybus had two doors. The electrical equipment was from CGE, and the body, with 58 seats, from Dalfa. 50 units were built Porto.

Technical characteristics

References

Double-decker buses
140
Trolleybuses
Vehicles introduced in 1967